Aodán Mac Suibhne is an Irish hurling referee.  A member of the St Jude's club in Dublin he is regarded as one of the sport's top referees and has officiated at several All-Ireland finals in minor, under-21 and senior levels.

References

 Donegan, Des, The Complete Handbook of Gaelic Games (DBA Publications Limited, 2005).

Year of birth missing (living people)
Living people
Hurling referees
Gaelic games players from County Dublin